Nava Atlas is an American cookbook author and artist. An archive of her papers is housed in the Sallie Bingham Center for Women’s History and Culture at Duke University.

Education
Nava Atlas received her B.F.A. degree from the University of Michigan in 1977, and her M.A. degree in Art Studio in 2007 from the State University of New York at New Paltz.

Cookbooks
Atlas has written and illustrated a number of vegetarian and vegan cookbooks. Her first cookbook, Vegetariana, came out in 1984,  and an entirely vegan edition of Vegetariana was released in 2021. 

Her first set of cookbooks focused on vegetarian and natural foods: The WholeFood Catalog: A complete Guide to Natural Foods (1988), American Harvest: Regional Recipes for the Vegetarian Kitchen (1991), Great American Vegetarian (1998), The Vegetarian 5- Ingredient Gourmet (2001), and The Vegetarian Family Cookbook (2004). Later, she transitioned to vegan and plant-based cookbooks: Vegan Holiday Kitchen (2011), Wild About Greens (2012), Plant Power (2014), 5-Ingredient Vegan (2019), Vegan on a Budget (2020), and Plant-Powered Protein (2020).

Book art
Atlas' work has been exhibited at Brooklyn Museum, National Museum of Women in the Arts, Victoria and Albert Museum, and the Wichita Art Museum. She makes artists' books, often experimenting with the physical form and incorporating found materials. Her works include: Secret Recipes for the Modern Wife (2009), Sluts & Studs (2008),  Tomcats & Trollops (2008),  (Mis)labeling Hillary (2008), Hand Jobs (2008), Deconstructing Elsie (2014), Why You Can't Get Married: an Unwedding Album (2013), The Completely-from-Scratch Steer-to-Sirloin Beef Slaughter Guide and Cookbook (2012), and Any Man Gets Tired of Toast All the Time (2007). Love and Marriage (2008) is a 1950s comic book in which all the dialogue has been replaced with original text by Atlas, and installations that feature text.

References

External links
 (art)
 (vegan cooking)
 Literary Ladies' Guide to the Writing Life
 Guide to the Nava Atlas papers - Duke University
Harper biography
Nava Atlas reflects on the (vegan) return of her cult-classic "Vegetariana" cookbook - Salon.com, April 12, 2022. 

Year of birth missing (living people)
Living people
21st-century American women
American cookbook writers
American veganism activists
American women artists
State University of New York at New Paltz alumni
University of Michigan alumni
Vegan cookbook writers
Vegetarian cookbook writers
Women book artists
Book artists
Women cookbook writers